Pluton may refer to:
 Pluton, a body of intrusive igneous rock
 A proposed IAU definition of planet rejected in favour of plutoid
 French ship Pluton (disambiguation), eight naval ships
 Spanish destroyer Plutón, 1897
 Pluton (missile), a French missile
 A village in Pipirig Commune, Neamţ County, Romania
 Pluton (complex), space radar, Crimea, 1960
 Pluton or Plouton, Greek for Pluto (mythology)
 Microsoft Pluton security processor

See also
 Plutino
 Pluto (disambiguation)
 Plutonism